Trans-Sulawesi Highway Indonesian:Jalan Trans-Sulawesi is a highway which connects Manado with Makassar, Sulawesi Island, is under construction to be upgraded and repaired.  Portions under construction include South Minahasa, Bolaang North, Mongondow, and North Gorontalo as of 2012.

See also

 Trans-Sumatran Highway
 Trans-Java toll road

References

Sulawesi
Highways in Indonesia